Charles, Prince of Löwenstein-Wertheim-Rosenberg (21 May 1834 – 8 November 1921) was a German nobleman, the Prince of Löwenstein-Wertheim-Rosenberg (1849–1908), Catholic politician and later a Dominican friar. He was the first President of the Catholic Society of Germany (1868), and a member of the Reichstag from 1871 for the Catholic Centre Party.

Early life
He was born in Haid, Kingdom of Bohemia, Austrian Empire, the second child of Constantine, Hereditary Prince of Löwenstein-Wertheim-Rosenberg (1802–1838), and Princess Agnes of Hohenlohe-Langenburg (1804–1835). He was a male-line descendant of Frederick I, Elector Palatine. He studied law, and succeeded to the headship of the House of Löwenstein-Wertheim-Rosenberg and the title of Prince (Fürst) in 1849.

Marriage and children
He married Princess Adelheid of Ysenburg-Büdingen (1841–1861) in 1859. After her death, he married Princess Sophie of Liechtenstein in Vienna in 1863. Sophie and Charles had eight children:

 Princess Franziska of Löwenstein-Wertheim-Rosenberg (Kleinheubach 30 March 1864 – Düsseldorf 12 April 1930)
 Princess Adelheid of Löwenstein-Wertheim-Rosenberg (Kleinheubach 17 July 1865 – Prague 6 September 1941), married Count Adalbert Joseph of Schönborn
 Princess Agnes of Löwenstein-Wertheim-Rosenberg (Kleinheubach 22 December 1866 – Oosterhout 23 January 1954)
 Joseph, Hereditary Prince of Löwenstein-Wertheim-Rosenberg (Kleinheubach 11 April 1868 – Rome 15 February 1870)
 Princess Maria Theresa of Löwenstein-Wertheim-Rosenberg (Rome 4 January 1870 – Vienna 17 January 1935), married Miguel, Duke of Braganza
 Aloys, Prince of Löwenstein-Wertheim-Rosenberg (Kleinheubach 15 September 1871 – Schloss Bronnbach 25 January 1952), married Countess Josephine Kinsky of Wchinitz and Tettau
 Princess Anna of Löwenstein-Wertheim-Rosenberg (Kleinheubach 28 September 1873 – Vienna 27 June 1936), married Prince Felix of Schwarzenberg
 Prince Johannes Baptista of Löwenstein-Wertheim-Rosenberg (Kleinheubach 29 August 1880 – Newport 18 May 1956), married Countess Alexandra of Bernstorff

Later life
After the death of his wife, he became a member of the Dominican Order as Fr. Raymundus Maria in 1907, and lived in the monastery of Venlo in the Netherlands. He was ordained as a Catholic priest in 1908. The same year, he gave up his title of Prince and was succeeded by his son. He died in Cologne.

Honours
He was a Knight of the Order of the Golden Fleece.

Ancestry

References

External links 

 
 Abtei St. Hildegardis: "Fürst Löwenstein-Wertheim-Rosenberg sorgte für einen Neubeginn"
 

1834 births
1921 deaths
People from Bor (Tachov District)
People from the Kingdom of Bohemia
House of Löwenstein-Wertheim-Rosenberg
Princes of Löwenstein-Wertheim-Rosenberg
German Bohemian people
German Dominicans
19th-century German Roman Catholic priests
Centre Party (Germany) politicians
Members of the Bavarian Reichsrat
Members of the Württembergian Chamber of Lords
Members of the First Chamber of the Estates of the Grand Duchy of Hesse
Members of the First Chamber of the Diet of the Grand Duchy of Baden
Members of the 1st Reichstag of the German Empire
Knights of the Golden Fleece of Austria
Central Committee of German Catholics members